Bjarne Henning-Jensen (6 October 1908 – 21 February 1995) was a Danish film director and screenwriter. He directed 21 films between 1941 and 1974. He was born in Copenhagen, Denmark and died in Denmark. He was married to Astrid Henning-Jensen.

Filmography

 Cykledrengene i Tørvegraven (1941)
 Brunkul (1941)
 Arbejdet kalder (1941)
 Sukker (1942)
 Papir (1942)
 S.O.S. - kindtand (1943)
 Korn (1943)
 Heste (1943)
 Naar man kun er ung (1943)
 De danske sydhavsøer (1944)
 Folketingsvalg (1945)
 Ditte menneskebarn (1946)
 Stemning i april (1947)
 De pokkers unger (1947)
 Kristinus Bergman (1948)
 Vesterhavsdrenge (1950)
 Solstik (1953)
 Ballettens børn (1954)
 Hvor bjergene sejler (1955)
 Paw (1959)
 Kort är sommaren (1962)
 Skipper & Co. (1974)

External links

1908 births
1995 deaths
Danish male screenwriters
Film directors from Copenhagen
20th-century screenwriters